Rhys ab Owen (born 12 January 1987), also sometimes referred to as Rhys ab Owen Thomas is a Plaid Cymru politician. He was elected to the Senedd in the South Wales Central region in the 2021 Senedd election. ab Owen was Plaid Cymru's spokesperson in the Senedd for the constitution and justice. He is a barrister. His, father Owen John Thomas, represented the same region for the same party.

Background 

Rhys ab Owen was born and raised in Cardiff. He is the son of Sian Wyn Thomas, a former headteacher of Ysgol Glan Morfa, Splott, and Owen John Thomas, a former Plaid Cymru politician who represented the South Wales Central region in the National Assembly for Wales from 1999 to 2007. Rhys attended Ysgol Gyfun Gymraeg Glantaf in Llandaff North, before reading law at the University of Oxford. ab Owen then undertook the Barrister Training Course at Cardiff University, and has practiced as a barrister since 2010.

Political career 
ab Owen stood for Plaid Cymru in the 2017 Cardiff Council election in the Canton ward, where he increased the Plaid Cymru vote from 910 to 2,105, narrowly losing to the winning Labour candidates.

Later, ab Owen stood in the 2021 Senedd election as a Plaid Cymru candidate for Cardiff West, competing against the incumbent MS and First Minister Mark Drakeford (Welsh Labour). Drakeford retained his seat in Cardiff West, with ab Owen finishing third behind Drakeford and the Conservative candidate, Sean Driscoll.  However, ab Owen was elected as a Member of the Senedd for South Wales Central, alongside fellow regional Plaid Cymru candidate Heledd Fychan, by virtue of topping the regional list of Plaid Cymru candidates in the region.

Upon reaching the Senedd, ab Owen became Plaid Cymru's constitution and justice spokesperson.

On 8 November 2022, ab Owen was suspended from Plaid Cymru, pending an investigation by the Senedd's standards watchdog over an alleged breach of the code of conduct.

Personal life 
In 2019, ab Owen married Manon Eluned George; the couple have a daughter. He lists his recreations as "Welsh history, choir, family, chapel" and is a member of the Ifor Bach club in Cardiff.

References

Living people
Welsh barristers
Wales MSs 2021–2026
Welsh-speaking politicians
1987 births